General elections were held in Islamabad Capital Territory on Monday, 25 February 1985 to elect 1 member of National Assembly of Pakistan from Islamabad.
Independent politician M. Nawaz Khokhar won Islamabad seat.

Candidates 
Total no of 16 Candidates contested for 1 National Assembly Seat from Islamabad.

Result 
M Nawaz Khokhar won the seat by obtaining 18,391 votes. His nearest rival Zafar Ali Shah got only 16,190 votes.

References

1985 elections in Pakistan
General elections in Pakistan